JP Morgan Emerging Markets Investment Trust is a large British investment trust dedicated to investments in emerging markets. Established in 1991, the company is a constituent of the FTSE 250 Index. The chairman is Alan Saunders.

References

External links
  Official site

Financial services companies established in 1991
Investment trusts of the United Kingdom
JPMorgan Chase